Artyom Pavlovich Kazakov (born 26 May 1990) is a former Russian professional football player.

Career
In March 2015, Kazakov signed for FC Sakhalin Yuzhno-Sakhalinsk. He made his Russian Football National League debut for Sakhalin on 22 March 2015 in a game against FC Tom Tomsk. That was his only season in the FNL.

References

External links
 
 
 Career summary by sportbox.ru

1990 births
Living people
Russian footballers
Association football defenders
FC Lokomotiv Moscow players
FC Sakhalin Yuzhno-Sakhalinsk players